James G. Hill (1841–1913) was an American architect who, during the period 1876 to 1883, headed the Office of the Supervising Architect of the United States Department of the Treasury, which oversaw major Federal buildings.

During that period he designed or supervised design of many courthouses, post offices and other public buildings.

During 1884–1901 he worked alone as a private architect, and during 1901–1909 he worked with Frederick A. Kendall as partner. From December 1878 to May 1879, Hill was suspended from his office while being investigated for fraud, with John Fraser serving as acting Supervising Architect in Hill's absence. Acquitted, Hill was immediately restored to his position.

Works associated with Hill include:
Atlantic Building, 928-30 F Street, NW, Washington, DC; built 1887-1888
Sidney R. Yates Federal Building (originally the Bureau of Engraving and Printing), 14th St. and Independence Ave. Washington, DC, NRHP-listed; built 1878–1880
Government Printing Office, North Capitol Street between G and H Streets, NW, Washington, DC
National Bank of Washington, Washington Branch, 301 7th St., N.W. Washington, DC, NRHP-listed
Old Post Office, State Street and Broadway, Albany, New York (NRHP listed)
Richmond Hill House, 45 Richmond Hill Rd. Asheville, North Carolina, NRHP-listed
Riggs National Bank, Washington Loan and Trust Company Branch, SW corner of 9th and F Sts., NW. Washington, DC, NRHP-listed
St. Margaret's Church, 1820 Connecticut Avenue, Washington, DC; built in 1895; Hill is credited with design work done for construction in 1900.
Security Storage, 1140 15th Street, NW, Washington, DC; built 1890; demolished 1965

References

External links
Matthew Brady studio photograph of James G. Hill

Further reading
Margaret Gordon Davis (1981), James G. Hill, Victorian architect, Washington, M.A. thesis, University of Virginia

19th-century American architects
1841 births
1914 deaths